Kaalan is a Keralite dish from South India, made of yoghurt, coconut and a raw fruit nendra kaaya or a tuber like the chena.

It is very thick, which distinguishes it from a similar curry known as pulisseri, and more sour than avial. For the same reason,  kaalan can last longer when stored.  In many preparations, more pepper and/or chillies are added to make the kaalan spicy, in addition to its signature sour taste.

Kaalan is typically served as part of the Sadya.

See also
 Cuisine of Kerala

References

External links

Kerala cuisine